Jean-Richard Bloch (25 May 1884 – 15 March 1947) was a French critic, novelist and playwright.

He was a member of the French Communist Party (PCF) and worked with Louis Aragon in the evening daily Ce soir.

Early life 
Bloch was born into a Jewish family. His father was an engineer with the SNCF.

Literary career
He became a professional writer in 1909, after having worked for two years in a high school as an aggregated teacher. By this time, he was already known as a left-leaning intellectual. In 1910 he launched  L’Effort libre, a "review of revolutionary civilization". 

He joined the French Army in World War I and was injured three times on the battlefields of the Marne and in Verdun. After the war, he felt remorse for having joined the army. He also suffered from neurosis caused by the horrors of war and by the premature death of his youngest daughter, Solange. It was during this time that Bloch traveled to Africa on the advice of a friend. His logbook made during this maritime voyage was published in newspapers and magazines of the period and was later serialized into a three volume book set.

In 1937, he was responsible for organising Naissance d'une cité, a "popular spectacle" performed on 19 October as part of the Exposition Internationale des Arts et Techniques dans la Vie Moderne.

Family life
Brother-in-law of André Maurois.

Literary works 

 A Publisher of "L'Effort Libre", 1910–1914 (left-wing literary magazine)
 Lévy, 1912
 ... et Compagnie, 1918 (novel)
 La nuit Kurde (novel)
 Sybilla, 1932 (novel)
 Carnaval est mort, 1920 (critic)
 A leader of "Europe" (with Jean Guéhenno)
 Offrande à la musique, 1930 (ballet)
 Destin du siècle, 1931
 Naissance d'une culture, 1936
 Toulon (a play)
 De la France trahie à la France en armes, 1949

References

External links

20th-century French novelists
20th-century French male writers
Jewish novelists
20th-century French Jews
French literary critics
20th-century French dramatists and playwrights
French Communist Party members
1884 births
1947 deaths
French male novelists
French male dramatists and playwrights
French senators elected by the National Assembly